St. John the Baptist Church (Samogitian: Žėdėku šv. Juona Krėkštītoja bažnīče) is a Roman Catholic church in Židikai, Lithuania. It is located in the west of Mažeikiai district municipality, near the road Mažeikiai-Skuodas.

History

The community worshiped in a wooden chapel as early as 1636. The current towerless stone church, constructed in 1821, reflects Classicism and Romantic  period features.

In 1842 the current belfry was built. In 1853 there was established a parish and priest Jonas Vaškevičius became the first parson of Židikai parish. Around 1861 the church was renovated and decorated. On 20 May 1862 bishop of Samogitia Motiejus Valančius consecrated the church.

In 1900 current pastorage was built. In this building from 1915 until her death in 1930 lived Lithuanian author and educational Šatrijos Ragana. In her honor wooden cross was built in churchyard.

In 1940-1944 the priest at that time Vaclovas Martinkus built a new two storey pastorage of stone however it was nationalised by the soviets and became a hospital.

Priests who had worked in Židikai church (since 1897) 
 Vincentas Bogdišenka (1897-1906)
 Juozapas Baltrukėnas (1906-1915)
 Kazimieras Bukontas (1915–1939)
 Vaclovas Martinkus  (1940–1945)
 Juozapas Našlėnas   (1945–1949)
 Povilas Repšys      (1949–1957)
 Juozapas Rutalė     (1957–1969)
 Jonas Petrauskis    (1969–1972)
 Stanislovas Ežerinskas (1972–1974)
 Domininkas Giedra   (1975–1983)
 Antanas Gylys       (1983–1991)
 Vytautas Gedvainis (1991–1992)
 Romualdas Žulpa     (1992–1997)
 Rimantas Gudlinkis  (1997–1999)
 Vytautas Vaidila (1999–2009)
 Egidijus Jurgelevičius (2009–2016)
 Antanas Šimkus (2016-2018)
 Dainoras Židackas (since 2018)

References

Roman Catholic churches in Telšiai County
Roman Catholic churches completed in 1821
Buildings and structures in Telšiai County
Tourist attractions in Telšiai County
19th-century Roman Catholic church buildings in Lithuania